Athous utschderensis is a species of click beetle from the family Elateridae found in Russian cities such as Novorossiysk, Sochi and Krasnodar, as well as the southwestern Caucasus.

References 

Beetles described in 1905
Endemic fauna of Russia